is a Shinto shrine located in Takachiho, Miyazaki Prefecture, Japan. It is dedicated to the sun goddess Amaterasu and sits above the gorge containing Ama-no-Iwato, the cave where, according to Japanese legend, the goddess hid after battle with her brother, plunging the world into darkness until lured out by the spirit of merriment Ame-no-Uzume.

The Amano-Iwato cave is an object of worship in festivals and is a rock cave on the other side of the Iwato River from nishihongū. You can see the cave from nishihongū after participating in a Shinto ritual for purification.

Gallery

References

External links

Ama-no-Iwato Jinja Official website

Beppyo shrines
Shinto shrines in Miyazaki Prefecture
Sun temples